This is a list of the official minimum wage rates of the 50 US states and the federal district of Washington, D.C. See minimum wage in the United States for much more info, including detailed state-by-state and city-by-city breakdown of the facts and numbers, and info on US territories. For comparisons to other countries see: List of countries by minimum wage.

Table for last few years 

Notes:
Bolding has been added in the table to current minimum wages that increased from last year.
 Table does not include info on pay for tipped, part-time, overtime, or underage employees.
TBD means "to be determined" on that date.
State links below are "Economy of STATE" links.

Additional information 

 $15.00 applies to employers of 26 or more employees. Employers of 25 or fewer employees must pay a minimum wage of $14.00 per hour.

 $12.50 applies to employers of 15 or more employees. Employers of 14 or fewer employees must pay a minimum wage of $12.20 per hour.

 The higher minimum wage applies to employers with annual gross revenues of at least $500,000. The lower minimum wage applies to smaller employers with annual gross revenues below $500,000.

 The lower minimum wage is for employees who are offered health insurance. Employees who are not offered health insurance must receive the higher minimum wage.

 The higher minimum wage applies to non-seasonal employers of 6 or more employees. The lower minimum wage applies to seasonal or smaller employers of 5 or fewer employees.

 The higher minimum wage applies to employers with annual gross revenues of a specified minimum amount ($372,000 in 2023, $342,000 in 2022, $323,000 in 2021, $319,000 in 2020, and $314,000 in 2019). The federal minimum wage of $7.25 applies to smaller employers with annual gross revenues below the specified minimum amount.

 $8.75 applies to employers of 6 or more employees at one specific location. Employers of 5 or fewer employees at one specific location must pay the federal minimum wage of $7.25 per hour.

Consolidated minimum wage table 

Below is a compact table of current minimum wages by U.S. state, U.S. territory, and the District of Columbia. The federal minimum wage applies in states with no state minimum wage (column titled "No MW Required"). This table duplicates the Department of Labor source page ("Consolidated Minimum Wage Table"). Go there for more details.

Note: See abbreviations list.
Note: Territories listed in this table (see bottom of columns too): 
GU = Guam. VI = U.S. Virgin Islands. PR = Puerto Rico. CNMI = Northern Mariana Islands.

Map of state minimum wages

See the date at the top of the map.

See also 

 Timeline of federal minimum hourly wage for the United States (including inflation-adjusted)
 Average worker's wage
 Fair Labor Standards Act of 1938
 History of labor law in the United States
 Income inequality in the United States
 List of countries by minimum wage
 Living wage
 Maximum wage
 Minimum Wage Fixing Convention 1970
 Minimum wage law
 Price/wage spiral
 United States labor law
 Wage slavery
 Wage theft (Act by employer of failing to pay wage per contract or legal required)
 Working poor
 List of countries by average wage
 List of countries by median wage
 List of countries by wealth per adult
 List of minimum wages in Canada
 List of minimum wages in China (PRC)
 The Minimum Wages Act, 1948
 List of European countries by minimum wage
 List of European Union member states by minimum wage
 List of European countries by average wage
 List of European countries by GNI (nominal) per capita
 List of countries by GDP (nominal)
 List of U.S. states and territories by median wage and mean wage

References

Further reading

External links 
 
 Federal Minimum Wage. United States Department of Labor Wage and Hour Division.
 Minimum Wages for Tipped Employees. United States Department of Labor Wage and Hour Division.
 Inflation Adjusted Minimum Wage by Year. Compares minimum wage adjusted for inflation by year.
 History of Federal Minimum Wage United States Department of Labor Wage and Hour Division.
 Maps and charts of minimum wage vs. housing costs – National Low Income Housing Coalition (advocacy group).

United States
Minimum wage
Minimum wage